The WACA Ground is a sport ground in Perth, Western Australia. The ground was established in 1893 and operated by the Western Australian Cricket Association. It hosted its first Test match in 1970 when Australia played England. The first One Day International (ODI) on the ground was played in 1980 and its first Twenty20 International (T20I) was played in 2007. Women's Test cricket was first played on the ground in 1958, the first women's on the ground ODI was played in 2005 and the first women's T20I on the ground was played in 2020.

The last Test match was played on the ground in 2017 with major international matches moving to the modern Perth Stadium. The ground continues to be used by Western Australia and for women's international matches, hosting five matches in the 2020 ICC Women's T20 World Cup.

In cricket, a five-wicket haul (also known as a "five-for" or "fifer") refers to a bowler taking five or more wickets in a single innings. This is regarded as a notable achievement. This article details the five-wicket hauls taken on the ground in official international Test and One Day International matches.

The first bowler to take a five-wicket haul in a Test match on the WACA Ground was Australian Jeff Thomson, who took five wickets at a cost of 93 runs (5/93) in 1974 against England in the second Test played on the ground. The best innings bowling figures in Test matches were achieved by Glenn McGrath who took 8/24 for Australia against Pakistan in 2004. The only woman to take a five-wicket haul on the ground is Australia's Ellyse Perry who took 5/28 in a Test match in 2014. The first five-wicket haul in an ODI on the ground was taken by New Zealander Richard Hadlee who took 5/32 against India in the first ODI played on the ground in 1980.

Key

Test match five-wicket hauls

A total of 61 five-wicket hauls were taken in Test matches on the WACA Ground, 60 of them in men's matches and one in a women's Test.

Men's matches

Women's matches

One Day International five-wicket hauls

In One Day International matches on the ground a total of 12 five-wicket hauls were taken.

Notes

References

External links
 International five-wicket hauls at WACA Ground, CricInfo

Australian cricket lists
WACA Ground